This is a list of earthquakes in 2014. Only earthquakes of magnitude 6 or above are included, unless they result in damage and/or casualties, or are notable for some other reason.  All dates are listed according to UTC time. Death toll was relatively low this year, and most of casualties came from China in August. The only 8 magnitude earthquake struck Chile.

Compared to other years

Overall

By death toll

By magnitude

By month

January

The earthquake killed 1 and another 30 were injured.
Two people were injured and seventeen buildings, including two mosques collapsed, while 93 others were damaged.
Seven people suffered injuries and minor damage, as well as landslides were reported in the epicentral area. Water supplies were heavily affected in Cephalonia.

February

Sixteen people were injured and further damage was caused, with 600 homes destroyed and 2,500 others damaged, some of which were affected by the January 26 quake.
Over 68,340 houses collapsed, with 168,468 others damaged, some severely. 500 bridges were also damaged, and over 11,000 livestock were killed, but no human casualties were reported.

March

Some damage was reported in Chinandega, as well as in neighbouring Honduras and in El Salvador.
A church was destroyed and over fifty buildings were damaged and power outages occurred in Sechura. Landslides also blocked roads there.
Cracks appeared on several buildings in Arica and Iquique.
This was an aftershock of the Magnitude 6.7 quake.
This is likely a foreshock of the event of the following day.
 A magnitude 5.1 earthquake struck 1 mile (1.6 km) east of La Habra on March 28 at a depth of 3.2 mi (5.1 km).

April

The earthquake caused 6 deaths and triggered a moderate tsunami.
The earthquake killed 2 people.
Significant structural damage occurred on outlying islands and one child was killed when their home collapsed.
The earthquake injured one person and caused blackouts in nearby regions.

May

The earthquake killed one person. This was the strongest earthquake in Thailand’s history
The earthquake killed two people.
 A magnitude 5.0 earthquake struck Elbasan, Albania on May 19 at a depth of 10.0 km (6.2 mi). Five buildings, including a school collapsed and dozens of others were damaged.
Two people died and 250 were injured.
The tremor killed three, injured at least 324 people and was widely felt across the region, causing minor damage in Bulgaria and Turkey as well.

June

Two people, including a child died when a house collapsed.

July

Four were killed in the state of  Chiapas, and the earthquake also affected Guatemala, where it killed at least four more people. 481 were injured.
One person was injured, 54 houses collapsed and 800 others were damaged.
Three people were injured and a  tsunami was triggered in Fukushima Prefecture.
Cracks appeared on several houses in Ít Ong.
One person died of a heart attack, another was injured and slight damage occurred.

August

The earthquake killed six people.
At least 617 people were killed, 3,143 were injured, and 112 were missing.
The earthquake killed one person and another 34 were wounded.
The earthquake killed at least 4 people and another 8 were injured.
The earthquake injured at least 250 people.
One woman died from her injuries 12 days later.

September

  A magnitude 3.5 earthquake struck Zenica, Bosnia and Herzegovina on September 4 at a depth of 5.0 km (3.1 mi). Five miners lost their lives due to a mining accident in Zenica.
The earthquake injured at least 8 people.
The earthquake killed 8 people.

October

The earthquake killed one person.
The earthquake killed at least three people in El Salvador, and another in Honduras.
The earthquake injured at least 4 people.
Cracks were reported in walls and plaster in Amfilochia.

November

Three people died and nine were injured due to a mining accident in Karviná.
A small tsunami was triggered.
The earthquake killed five people and another 54 were injured.
The earthquake injured at least 41 people.
The earthquake injured 9 people.
The earthquake injured at least 3 people. 

December

The earthquake killed a 9 year old boy and another 8 people were wounded.
Cracks appeared in the walls of several homes, and a 34-year old man was killed by a landslide.
It was the largest in a series of earthquakes, and caused damage to houses and a school in Velagici.

References

External links
USGS Map of Worldwide Earthquakes of at Least Magnitude 6.0 in 2014

2014
 
2014 natural disasters
2014